Petea may refer to:

 Petea, a village in the commune Pălatca, Cluj County, Romania
 Petea, a village in the commune Band, Mureș County, Romania
 Petea, a village in the commune Dorolț, Satu Mare County, Romania
 Petea River, a tributary of the Peţa River in Romania

People with the name 
 Petea Vâlcov (1910–1943), Romanian football player